Gaiser is a surname. Notable people with the surname include:

Fred Gaiser (1885–1918), American baseball player
Fritz Gaiser (1907–?), German cross-country skier
George Gaiser (born 1945), American football player
Jens Gaiser (born 1978), German nordic combined skier
Marco Gaiser (born 1993), German footballer 
Megan Gaiser, American business executive